Allium antiatlanticum is a plant species native to Morocco and Algeria. It is a bulb-forming perennial with a scent resembling that of garlic or leeks. It has a bulb, and is pollinated by bees and other insects.

References

antiatlanticum
Onions
Flora of Morocco
Flora of Algeria
Plants described in 1932